Hohenberg or Hohenburg Castle may refer to:
 Hohenburg (Lenggries), a ruined medieval castle in Lenggries, Bavaria
 Schloss Hohenburg, an 18th-century palace in Lenggries, Bavaria
 Burgruine Hohenburg auf Rosenberg, a ruined medieval castle in Carinthia, Austria
 Château de Hohenbourg, a ruined castle in Alsace, France
 , Hohenberg an der Eger, Bavaria

See also
 Hohenburg (disambiguation)